A Pair of Sixes is a 1918 American silent comedy film directed by Lawrence C. Windom and starring Taylor Holmes, Robert Conness and Alice Mann.

Cast
 Taylor Holmes as 	T. Boggs Johns
 Robert Conness as 	George B. Nettleton
 Alice Mann as 	Florence Cole
 Edna Phillips as 	Mrs. Nettleton
 Cecil Owen as Thomas J. Vanderholt
 Maude Eburne as 	Coddles
 C.E. Ashley as Krone
 John Cossar as Applegate
 Byron Aldenn as 	Tony Toler
 Virginia Bowker as 	Sally Parker
 Tommy Carey as Jimmie

References

Bibliography
 Connelly, Robert B. The Silents: Silent Feature Films, 1910-36, Volume 40, Issue 2. December Press, 1998.

External links
 

1918 films
1918 comedy films
1910s English-language films
American silent feature films
Silent American comedy films
American black-and-white films
Films directed by Lawrence C. Windom
American films based on plays
Essanay Studios films
1910s American films